Boujdour (or Bujdur, Bojador) is a city in the disputed territory of Western Sahara, near Cape Bojador. 
It is de facto administered by Morocco, which includes it in the administrative division of the Southern Provinces.
It is an urban municipality in  Boujdour Province, in the Laâyoune-Sakia El Hamra region.

History 

Boujdour was originally a fishing village built around the Cape Boujdour Lighthouse. 
The locality was administered by Spain from 1860 to 1975. 
From 1976, the city began to acquire an urban character, supported by population growth and its new port. 
Emerging from the desert, Boujdour has become the capital of the province. 
It has benefited from the “Al Aouda” and “Al Wahda” programs. 
The state's effort in favor of this province is also directed towards the creation of fishing villages. 
On the other hand, in 1976, a seawater desalination unit was installed there and research led to the discovery of underground water in the vicinity of the city.

The town was attacked by the Polisario Front on 13 February 1980.

Demography

According to Moroccan censuses; Boujdour had 36,843 inhabitants in 2004 and 42,651 in 2014.

Harbor

Port Boujdour is one of four fishing ports in the Boujdour province, the others being Lacraa, Aftissat (أفتيسات) and Agti el Ghazi (أغتي الغازي‎) .
The port is protected by a  barrier and a  embankment.
There are three  berths for the traditional fleet.
The port has a sloped shore for hauling fishing boats onto land.
As of 2012 infrastructure included:
 A fish market.
 A platform for classification of industrial fish.
 8 traditional workshops to repair fishing boats.
 25 warehouses for fish wholesalers located outside the fishing area.
 168 warehouses for ship owners inside the port.
 Two ice plants in the process of being completed.
 Two petrol stations are in the process of being completed.
 A medical center with an area of 100 square meters.
 Standard Container Management Unit.
The Boujdour maritime district in 2012 had 1,732 licensed traditional fishing boats, of which 765 operated from the port of Boujdour.
There were 5,200 sailors or divers in the district, about 200 fish wholesalers, 50 industrial workers and 33 carpenters, and 147 in other occupations such as fishing with rods and collecting algae and snails.
There was one unit for drying fish, two units for packing fresh fish and three accredited centers for packing and shipping live oysters.

Education

Elementary schools: 
Abdul Aziz Khaya School
Hassan II School
Moulay Rachid School
Emission School
Al Masirah School
Middle schools: 
Ibn Tofail middle school
Jerusalem middle school
Omar Ibn Al-Khattab middle school
Secondary schools: 
Jaber bin Hayyan High School (ثانوية جابر بن حيان)
Ahmed bin Mohammed Al Rashidi High School (ثانوية أحمد بن محمد الراشدي)
Special education 
Ajyal Boujdour Foundation (مؤسسة أجيال بوجدور)
Other institutions 
Boujdour Maritime Vocational Rehabilitation Center (مركز التأهيل المهني البحري بوجدور). It provides training for male and female students in fishing and dealing with mechanical equipment. It is supported by the Ministry of National Education, Vocational Training, and the Ministry of Agriculture and Fishing.
Boujdour Specialized Institute of Applied Technology (المعهد المتخصص للتكنولوجيا التطبيقية بوجدور). The institute offers courses in commerce, electrical installation, automobile repair and Microsoft Office.

Health
The city of Boujdour has a regional hospital that has been operating since 1991.
As of 2017 it had 36 beds, 16 doctors, 74 nurses and 45 administrative staff.
A 2018 audit was critical of the hospital's administration and procedures.
The hospital was also not equipped for orthopedic surgery.
Facilities for handling pharmaceuticals were inadequate.
The Ministry of Health responded that it was working on improvements, but was handicapped by shortage of human resources.
In 2020 it was reported that modern medical equipment had been delivered to the hospital, which would help it cope with the Covid-19 pandemic.

Twin city

 Keta, Ghana, since 20 December 2009

Notes

Sources

External link

 

Port cities and towns in Western Sahara